The 1971–72 season of the Moroccan Throne Cup was the 16th edition of the competition.

The two finalists, Chabab Mohammédia and Racing de Casablanca, were both declared winners in the final. Chabab Mohammédia and Racing de Casablanca both won the title for the first time in their history.

Tournament

Last 16

Quarter-finals

Semi-finals

Final 
The final between the two winning semi-finalists, Chabab Mohammédia and Racing de Casablanca, did not take place, and both clubs were declared winners in 1972.

Notes and references 

1971
1971 in association football
1972 in association football
1971–72 in Moroccan football